Keshvar may refer to:
Clime, the divisions of the inhabited portion of the Earth by geographic latitude
Keshvar Rural District, Iran
Istgah-e Keshvar, a village in the Keshvar Rural District